The 2003 IAAF World Cross Country Championships took place on March 29/30, 2003.  The races were held at the L'Institut Équestre National in Avenches near Lausanne, Switzerland.  Reports of the event were given in The New York Times, in the Herald, and for the IAAF.

Complete results for senior men, for senior men's teams, for men's short race, for men's short race teams, for junior men, for junior men's teams, senior women, for senior women's teams, for women's short race, for women's short race teams, for junior women,  for junior women's teams, medallists, and the results of British athletes who took part were published.

Doping
There were several doping positives at the championships.

Positives at the 2003 IAAF World Cross Country Championships
 Pamela Chepchumba  – 2-year ban (EPO) 
 Alberto García Fernandez  – 2-year ban (EPO)
 Soumiya Labani  – 2-year ban
 Asmae Leghzaoui  – 2-year ban (EPO)

Medallists

Race results

Senior men's race (12.355 km)

Note: Athletes in parentheses did not score for the team result (n/s: nonscorer)

Men's short race (4.03 km)

Note: Athletes in parentheses did not score for the team result (n/s: nonscorer)

Junior men's race (7.92 km)

Note: Athletes in parentheses did not score for the team result (n/s: nonscorer)

Senior women's race (7.92 km)

Note: Athletes in parentheses did not score for the team result (n/s: nonscorer)

Women's short race (4.03 km)

Note: Athletes in parentheses did not score for the team result (n/s: nonscorer)

Junior women's race (6.215)

Note: Athletes in parentheses did not score for the team result (n/s: nonscorer)

Medal table (unofficial)

Note: Totals include both individual and team medals, with medals in the team competition counting as one medal.

Participation
According to an unofficial count, 605 athletes from 65 countries participated. This is in agreement with the official numbers as published.

 (20)
 (2)
 (1)
 (8)
 (1)
 (3)
 (12)
 (24)
 (1)
 (4)
 (2)
 (8)
 (33)
 (1)
 (2)
 (9)
 (3)
 (1)
 (12)
 (16)
 (28)
 (22)
 (2)
 (2)
 (1)
 (4)
 (2)
 (14)
 (18)
 (2)
 (2)
 (35)
 (4)
 (1)
 (3)
 (31)
 (1)
 (12)
 (1)
 (1)
 (24)
 (4)
 (12)
 (7)
 (1)
 (2)
 (2)
 (8)
 (36)
 (5)
 (23)
 (5)
 (6)
 (12)
 (10)
 (6)
 (7)
 (3)
 (29)
 (35)
 (2)
 (12)
 (1)
 (1)
 (3)

See also
 2003 IAAF World Cross Country Championships – Senior men's race
 2003 IAAF World Cross Country Championships – Men's short race
 2003 IAAF World Cross Country Championships – Junior men's race
 2003 IAAF World Cross Country Championships – Senior women's race
 2003 IAAF World Cross Country Championships – Women's short race
 2003 IAAF World Cross Country Championships – Junior women's race
 2003 in athletics (track and field)

References

External links
Official site

 
2003
C
IAAF World Cross Country Championships
International athletics competitions hosted by Switzerland
Cross country running in Switzerland
IAAF World Cross Country Championships